Sideroxylon alachuense, known by the common names Alachua bully, silver bully and silvery buckthorn, is a plant species native to the US states of Georgia and Florida. It grows in forested areas on hummocks, or near lime sinks or shell middens, at elevations of less than 200 m (650 feet).

Sideroxylon alachuense is a deciduous tree up to 10 m (33 feet) tall. Stems are armed with thorns but otherwise glabrous. Mature leaf blades are up to 70 mm (2.8 inches) long, shiny dark green above, with the underside silvery pubescent. Note: The underside of newly emergent Sideroxylon tenax leaves can have similar silvery pubescence which, however. will turn coffee-colored as they mature. White flowers are borne in bundles of up to 20 flowers. Berries are black, up to 13 mm (0.5 inches) in diameter.

The species is named for the locale where its type specimen was collected, the Alachua Sink inside Paynes Prairie Preserve State Park in Alachua County, Florida.

References

alachuense
Flora of Florida
Flora of Georgia (U.S. state)